The African Securities Exchanges Association (ASEA) was incorporated in 1993 in Nairobi (Republic of Kenya). ASEA's aim is to provide a formal framework for the mutual co-operation of securities exchanges in the African region. Its functions include the exchange of information and assistance in the development of member exchanges.

There are 30 exchanges in Africa, representing 39 nations' capital markets. ASEA has 26 Full Members and 6 Associate Members in 2022.

Related Organisations

Bolsa de Valores de Cabo Verde - Praia, Cape Verde
Bolsa de Valores de Mozambique - Maputo, Mozambique
Botswana Stock Exchange - Gaborone, Botswana
Bourse Regionale des Valeurs Mobilieres - Abidjan, Côte d'Ivoire
Bourse des Valeurs Mobilières de Tunis - Tunis, Tunisia
Casablanca Stock Exchange - Casablanca, Morocco
Egyptian Exchange - Cairo, Egypt
FMDQ Securities Exchange - Lagos, Nigeria
Dar es Salaam Stock Exchange - Dar es Salaam, Tanzania
Douala Stock Exchange - Douala, Cameroon
Ghana Stock Exchange - Accra, Ghana
JSE Limited - Sandown, South Africa
Khartoum Stock Exchange - Khartoum, Sudan
Libyan Stock Market - Tripoli, Libya
Lusaka Stock Exchange - Lusaka, Zambia
Malawi Stock Exchange - Blantyre, Malawi
Nairobi Stock Exchange - Nairobi, Kenya (Now Nairobi Securities Exchange Limited)
Namibian Stock Exchange - Windhoek, Namibia
Nigerian Stock Exchange - Lagos, Nigeria
Rwanda Stock Exchange - Kigali, Rwanda
Stock Exchange of Mauritius - Port Louis, Mauritius
Sierra Leone Stock Exchange - Sierra Leone
Uganda Securities Exchange Limited - Kampala, Uganda
Zimbabwe Stock Exchange - Harare, Zimbabwe

In addition, the African Securities Exchanges maintains a partnership agreement with the Federation of Euro-Asian Stock Exchanges.

See also
List of stock exchanges

References

External links
African Securities Exchanges Association
African Capital Markets News
Investing in Africa
Nairobi Securities Exchange
Johannesburg Stock Exchange
World Federation of Exchanges
Sierra Leone: a one-stock shop

Stock exchanges in Africa
Finance industry associations
Organisations based in Nairobi